The Thomson–Urrutia Treaty was ratified on April 20, 1921 between the United States and Colombia. Based on the terms of the agreement, the U.S. paid Colombia 25 million dollars in return for Colombia's recognition of Panama's independence.  This resolved the United States support of the separation of Panama from Colombia in 1903.  It was successfully negotiated and signed by the U.S. on April 6, 1914 and ratified by Colombia on June 9 of that year but not ratified by the US until 1921.

References

External links
Thomson-Urrutia Treaty
The Encyclopedia of World History (2001)
Chronology 1921

Treaties of Colombia
Treaties of the United States
Treaties concluded in 1921
Colombia–United States relations